Richard Eugene Turner (April 8, 1920 – November 15, 1986) was a fighter pilot with the 9th Air Force in the European Theater during World War II and early in the Korean War. He became an ace during World War II, scoring 12 victories. He was named Commanding Officer of the 356th Fighter Squadron of the 354th Fighter Group in February 1944. He wrote of his experience in Mustang Pilot, first published in 1970.

In World War II Turner was awarded the following decorations: Silver Star, Distinguished Flying Cross with one oak leaf cluster, Air Medal with 12 oak leaf clusters, Croix de Guerre with Palm, EAME Ribbon with 4 Bronze Stars, and ATO Ribbon with one Bronze Star.

References

Sources
Turner, Richard E. (1983) Big Friend, Little Friend: Memoirs of a World War II Fighter Pilot Mesa, AZ: Champlin Fighter Museum Press
Olynyk, Frank (1995) Stars & Bars: A Tribute to the American Fighter Ace, 1920–1973 London: Grub Street the Basement
Scutts, Jerry and Davey, Chris (1995) Mustang Aces of the Ninth and Fifteenth Air Forces and the RAF London: Osprey Publishing
Hess, William N. and Ivie, Thomas G. (1992) "P-51 Mustang Aces" Osceola, WI: Motorbooks International

1920 births
1986 deaths
American Korean War pilots
20th-century American memoirists
American World War II flying aces
Recipients of the Air Medal
Recipients of the Distinguished Flying Cross (United States)
Recipients of the Silver Star
United States Army Air Forces pilots of World War II